The index of physics articles is split into multiple pages due to its size.

To navigate by individual letter use the table of contents below.

N

N-Reactor
N-body choreography
N-body problem
N-body simulation
N-type semiconductor
N-vector model
N.V.V.J. Swamy
N=2 superstring
NA35 experiment
NA48/1 experiment
NA48/2 experiment
NA48/3 experiment
NA48 experiment
NA49 experiment
NA58 experiment
NA60 experiment
NA61
NA61/SHINE
NA62 experiment
NACA airfoil
NACA cowling
NACA duct
NAMD
NASA/IPAC Extragalactic Database
NASA Advanced Space Transportation Program
NASA STI Program
NDDO
NESTOR Project
NEVOD
NIMs
NINA (accelerator)
NIST-F1
NMSSM
NNPDF
NOON state
NOνA
NRX
NS5-brane
NUR Reactor
N ray
Nabor Carrillo Flores
Nader Engheta
Nahum Shahaf
Nai-Chang Yeh
Naked singularity
Nambu mechanics
Nambu–Goto action
Nambu–Jona-Lasinio model
Nandor Balazs
Nano-PSI
Nano-optics
Nano-thermite
Nano spray dryer
Nanocellulose
Nanochannel glass materials
Nanocircuitry
Nanoelectromechanical system
Nanoelectronics
Nanoengineering
Nanofluidics
Nanoindenter
Nanoknife
Nanolaser
Nanolens
Nanomagnet
Nanoparticle
Nanophotonics
Nanoscopic scale
Nanoshell
Nanotechnology
Nanotribology
Narasimhaiengar Mukunda
Naresh Dadhich (physicist)
Naresh Dalal
Narinder Singh Kapany
Narrow-gap semiconductor
Narrow bipolar pulse
Natalia Dubrovinskaia
Nathan Aviezer
Nathan Isgur
Nathan Rosen
Nathan Seiberg
National Atomic Testing Museum
National Center for Earth-surface Dynamics
National Centre for Physics
National Compact Stellarator Experiment
National High Magnetic Field Laboratory
National Ignition Facility
National Museum of Nuclear Science & History
National Research Universal reactor
National Spherical Torus Experiment
National Synchrotron Light Source
National Synchrotron Light Source II
National Synchrotron Radiation Research Center
Natterer compressor
Natural Bridges National Monument Solar Power System
Natural abundance
Natural circulation
Natural material
Natural nuclear fission reactor
Natural philosophy
Natural remanent magnetisation
Natural remanent magnetization
Natural ventilation
Naturalness (physics)
Nature
Nature Communications
Nature Materials
Nature Nanotechnology
Nature Photonics
Nature Physics
Navarro–Frenk–White profile
Navier–Stokes equations
Navier–Stokes existence and smoothness
Navigation mesh
Nazir Ahmed (physicist)
Naïve physics
Nd:GdVO4
Nd:YAG laser
Nd:YCOB
Neal Francis Lane
Neal H. Williams
Near-extremal black hole
Near-surface geophysics
Near and far field
Near edge X-ray absorption fine structure
Nearly free electron model
Negative differential conductivity
Negative index material
Negative index metamaterial
Negative index metamaterials
Negative index of refraction
Negative luminescence
Negative mass
Negative phase-velocity
Negative phase velocity
Negative phase velocity medium
Negative phase velocity mediums
Negative phasevelocity
Negative phase–velocity medium
Negative phase–velocity mediums
Negative probability
Negative refraction
Negative refractive index
Negative refractive index material
Negative refractive indices
Negative resistance
Negative temperature
Negative thermal expansion
Negativity (quantum mechanics)
Negentropy
Neil F. Johnson
Neil Gershenfeld
Neil J. Gunther
Neil Turok
Neil deGrasse Tyson
Nekhoroshev estimates
Nematicon
Neo-Hookean solid
Neodymium-doped yttrium lithium fluoride
Neodymium-doped yttrium orthovanadate
Neodymium magnet
Neon-burning process
Neon lighting
Nernst effect
Nernst–Planck equation
Net force
Net generation
Net radiometer
Network analysis (electrical circuits)
Network automaton
Network synthesis
Network synthesis filters
Neumann's law
Neuronal noise
Neutral beam injection
Neutral buoyancy
Neutral current
Neutral density filter
Neutral heavy lepton
Neutral particle
Neutral particle oscillation
Neutralino
Neutretto
Neutrino
Neutrino Array Radio Calibration
Neutrino Ettore Majorana Observatory
Neutrino Factory
Neutrino astronomy
Neutrino decoupling
Neutrino detector
Neutrino mixing matrix
Neutrino oscillation
Neutrino telescope
Neutrino theory of light
Neutrium
Neutron
Neutron-induced swelling
Neutron Science Laboratory
Neutron Time Of Flight
Neutron absorption
Neutron activation
Neutron activation analysis
Neutron backscattering
Neutron bomb
Neutron capture
Neutron capture nucleosynthesis
Neutron cross section
Neutron detection
Neutron diffraction
Neutron economy
Neutron emission
Neutron flux
Neutron generator
Neutron interferometer
Neutron magnetic moment
Neutron moderator
Neutron monitor
Neutron number
Neutron poison
Neutron probe
Neutron radiation
Neutron reflectometry
Neutron reflector
Neutron research facility
Neutron scattering
Neutron source
Neutron spin echo
Neutron star
Neutron supermirror
Neutron temperature
Neutron time-of-flight scattering
Neutron transport
Neutronium
Nevill Francis Mott
Neville Robinson
Nevis Laboratories
New Journal of Physics
Newman–Penrose formalism
Newton's cannonball
Newton's cradle
Newton's law of universal gravitation
Newton's laws of motion
Newton's notation
Newton's rings
Newton's theorem of revolving orbits
Newton second
Newton (unit)
Newton disc
Newton metre
Newtonian fluid
Newtonian gauge
Newtonian limit
Newtonian motivations for general relativity
Newton–Cartan theory
Newton–Euler equations
Newton–Wigner localization
Next Generation Nuclear Plant
Ni Weidou
Niccolò Zucchi
Nicholas B. Suntzeff
Nicholas Callan
Nicholas Christofilos
Nicholas J. Phillips
Nicholas Kemmer
Nicholas Kurti
Nicholas Metropolis
Nick Herbert (physicist)
Nick Holonyak
Nick Newman (naval architect)
Nicol prism
Nicola Cabibbo
Nicola Scafetta
Nicolaas Bloembergen
Nicolaas Hartsoeker
Nicolae Filip
Nicolae Vasilescu-Karpen
Nicolas-Philippe Ledru
Nicolas Clément
Nicolas Fuss
Nicolas Léonard Sadi Carnot
Nicolas Rashevsky
Nicolaus Copernicus
Nicolás Cabrera
Niels Bohr
Niels Bohr Institute
Niels Bohr Institute for Astronomy, Geophysics and Physics
Niels Bohr Institute for Astronomy, Physics and Geophysics
Nielsen–Olesen vortex
Nielsen–Olsen string
Nigel G. Stocks
Nigel Lockyer
Night Thoughts of a Classical Physicist
Nihat Berker
Nike laser
Nikita Nekrasov
Nikola Tesla
Nikola Tesla Museum
Nikolai Borisovich Delone
Nikolai Kasterin
Nikolai Pilchikov
Nikolai Pylchykov
Nikolai Shakura
Nikolas Tombazis
Nikolay Basov
Nikolay Bogolyubov
Nikolay Dollezhal
Nikolay Kudryavtsev
Nikolay Neprimerov
Nikolay Rukavishnikov
Nikolay Semyonov
Nikolay Sergeyevich Krylov
Nikolay Umov
Nikolay Yegorovich Zhukovsky
Nima Arkani-Hamed
Nimrod (synchrotron)
Nimrud lens
Nina Byers
Ning Li (physicist)
Nishina Memorial Prize
Nitrogen-vacancy center
Nitrogen laser
No-broadcast theorem
No-cloning theorem
No-communication theorem
No-go theorem
No-hair theorem
No-slip condition
No-teleportation theorem
Noah Ernest Dorsey
Nobel Prize in Physics
Node (physics)
Noemie Benczer Koller
Noether's second theorem
Noether's theorem
Noether identities
Noise
Noise-equivalent flux density
Noise-equivalent power
Noise-equivalent target
Noise (audio)
Noise (electronic)
Noise (electronics)
Noise (radio)
Noise (telecommunications)
Noise (video)
Noise barrier
Noise figure
Noise floor
Noise map
Noise measurement
Noise power
Noise print
Noise reduction coefficient
Noise temperature
Noise weighting
Noisy black
Noisy white
Nomarski prism
Non-Gaussianity
Non-Newtonian fluid
Non-abelian gauge transformation
Non-achromatic objective
Non-autonomous mechanics
Non-contact force
Non-critical string
Non-critical string theory
Non-critical string theory: Lorentz invariance
Non-dimensionalization and scaling of the Navier–Stokes equations
Non-equilibrium statistical mechanics
Non-equilibrium thermodynamics
Non-exact solutions in general relativity
Non-inclined orbit
Non-inertial frame
Non-inertial reference frame
Non-linear sigma model
Non-orientable wormhole
Non-perturbative
Non-standard cosmology
Non-topological soliton
Non-uniform circular motion
Non-zero dispersion-shifted fiber
Nonbaryonic dark matter
Nonclassical light
Noncommutative quantum field theory
Nondimensionalization
Nonequilibrium Gas and Plasma Dynamics Laboratory
Nonequilibrium partition identity
Nonextensive entropy
Nonholonomic system
Nonimaging optics
Nonlinear acoustics
Nonlinear control
Nonlinear metamaterials
Nonlinear optics
Nonlinear partial differential equation
Nonlinear photonic crystal
Nonlinear resonance
Nonlinear Schrödinger equation
Nonlinear system
Nonlinear X-wave
Nonlinearity (journal)
Nonlocal Lagrangian
Nonoblique correction
Nonrectifying junction
Nonsingular black hole models
Nonsymmetric gravitational theory
Nonthermal plasma
Noor Muhammad Butt
Nordström's theory of gravitation
Nordtvedt effect
Normal force
Normal mode
Normal moveout
Normal order
Normal shock tables
Normal strain
Normalizable wave function
Norman Christ
Norman Feather
Norman Foster Ramsey, Jr.
Norman Haskell
Norman Holter
Norman Kember
Norman Packard
Norman Robert Campbell
Noro–Frenkel law of corresponding states
Norris Bradbury
Northstar Electronics
Norton's theorem
Nose cone design
Nothing comes from nothing
Nova
Nova (laser)
November Revolution (physics)
Novette laser
Novikov–Veselov equation
Nozzle
Nth Country Experiment
NuMI
Nucifer experiment
Nuclear Instrumentation Module
Nuclear Instruments
Nuclear Instruments and Methods
Nuclear Instruments and Methods in Physics Research
Nuclear Instruments and Methods in Physics Research A
Nuclear Instruments and Methods in Physics Research B
Nuclear Overhauser effect
Nuclear Physics (disambiguation)
Nuclear Physics (journal)
Nuclear Physics A
Nuclear Physics B
Nuclear Physics B: Proceedings Supplements
Nuclear Power Demonstration
Nuclear Safety Research Reactor
Nuclear Science Abstracts
Nuclear aircraft
Nuclear astrophysics
Nuclear attribution
Nuclear binding energy
Nuclear chain reaction
Nuclear cross section
Nuclear data
Nuclear density
Nuclear detection
Nuclear drip line
Nuclear explosion
Nuclear explosive
Nuclear fission
Nuclear fission product
Nuclear force
Nuclear fuel
Nuclear fuel cycle information system
Nuclear fusion
Nuclear isomer
Nuclear magnetic moment
Nuclear magnetic resonance
Nuclear magnetic resonance crystallography
Nuclear magnetic resonance in porous media
Nuclear magnetic resonance quantum computer
Nuclear magnetic resonance spectroscopy
Nuclear magnetic resonance spectroscopy of nucleic acids
Nuclear magnetic resonance spectroscopy of proteins
Nuclear magneton
Nuclear material
Nuclear matter
Nuclear microscopy
Nuclear physics
Nuclear power
Nuclear pumped laser
Nuclear quadrupole resonance
Nuclear reaction
Nuclear reactor
Nuclear reactor safety systems
Nuclear resonance fluorescence
Nuclear resonance vibrational spectroscopy
Nuclear safety
Nuclear shell model
Nuclear size
Nuclear structure
Nuclear timescale
Nuclear transmutation
Nuclear waste management
Nuclear weapon design
Nuclearelectrica
Nucleate boiling
Nucleocosmogenesis
Nucleogenesis
Nucleon
Nucleon pair breaking in fission
Nucleon spin structure
Nucleosynthesis
Nuclide
Nuclotron
Nuker Team
Null corrector
Null dust solution
Null surface
Nuller
Nulling interferometry
Number density
Numerical model of the Solar System
Numerical relativity
Numerical sign problem
Numerical weather prediction
Nuovo Cim.
Nuovo Cimento
Nuovo Cimento A
Nuovo Cimento B
Nuovo Cimento C
Nuovo Cimento D
Nuovo Cimento Rivista
Nusselt number
Nutation
Nuts and bolts (general relativity)
Néel relaxation theory
Néel temperature

Indexes of physics articles